Neoempheria is a genus of fungus gnats in the family Mycetophilidae. There are at least 140 described species in Neoempheria.

See also
 List of Neoempheria species

References

Further reading

External links

 

Mycetophilidae
Articles created by Qbugbot
Taxa named by Carl Robert Osten-Sacken
Sciaroidea genera